The Czech Women's Volleyball Cup  is organized by the Czech Volleyball Federation ( Český volejbalový svaz , ČVS). It was created in 1993 and it is the second most important Women's Volleyball club competition after the Czech Women's Volleyball Extraliga in the Czech Republic.

Competition history

Winners list

Honours by Club

References

External links
 www.cvf.cz in (Czech)

Volleyball in the Czech Republic